Sıla is a Turkish television series directed by Gül Oğuz for ATV and ATV Avrupa (Europe) in 2006. On September 15, 2006, ATV started broadcasting Sila. The last episode was broadcast on September 20, 2008.

Sila began airing in the Arab World in 2010 and gained great popularity and success throughout its run. In Greece the projection of Sila started the June 10, 2012 at Mega Channel. In Croatia, this series was aired from December 2012 to May 2013 on Nova TV. In Serbia, Montenegro and Bosnia and Herzegovina this series started  on December 15, 2013 at 20:00 on RTV Pink, Pink M and Pink BH, and it became one of the highest watched Turkish TV series breaking all records.

In Slovakia started on August 5, 2013 on channel TV Doma and was breaking channel records. In Slovenia started on May 15, 2014 on  channel POP TV, and in North Macedonia on October 1, 2014 on Sitel TV. In Romania started on January 5, 2015 on the channels PRO TV (the first 4 episodes) and Acasă (all of episodes). In Bulgaria started on February 9, 2015 on channel bTV. In Chile started on March 8, 2015 on channel Mega, in Colombia in 2016 it will be released soon by RCN Television. In Brazil started on 2016, as part of TV Bandeirantes programming.

Episodes

Plot

Sila is a girl given to a wealthy family in Istanbul. Her biological parents gave her away because she was sick. Later, her biological father, Celil, and her brother, Azad, which she believed have died, come to take her away claiming that her mother was very sick and needed to see her before she died. However, she was brought up with deception to marry Boran, the boss of Mardin tribe, to repay a debt of her brother Azad for escaping with Narin, the sister of the tribe leader Boran. (In the Mardin tribe the tradition says if someone tries to steal a girl or flees with a girl, they either have to kill them both or the boy’s family has to give a girl from their family in return) Sila and her Father go to Mardin in order to meet Sila’s family but just after a few days, her father has to return for an urgent work. Nevertheless, Sila decides to stay a little bit longer. As she is getting ready thinking that they are celebrating her brother Azad’s wedding and her return together. However, the reality was they were marrying her of to Boran, the boss of Mardin tribe. During her stay on Mardin, Sila suffered pressure for Boran parents, she helps her servant and friend Ayse, and tries to change injustices caused by the tribal customs. Sila escapes with Narin and Azad to Istanbul. Boran is willing to do anything to comply with tradition: to kill his "wife" and his sister and her husband Azad. Because as the tradition written says that Sila has to die if she runs away.

In the end, Sila and Boran are happy and even expecting their twin daughters Sude and Bade. In addition, Boran is again declared as the boss of the Mardin tribe, in the end everyone seems happy.

Cast

Cansu Dere as Sila Sönmez/Özdemir/Genco - Wife of Boran, mother of Bedirhan, daughter of Bedar & Celil, sister of Azad, Dilan & Emir
Mehmet Akif Alakurt as Boran Ağa/Boran Genco - Leader of Mardin tribe, husband of Sila, father of Bedirhan, son of Kevser & Firuz Ağa, brother of Narin
Zeynep Eronat as Bedar Sönmez - Wife of Celil, mother of Sila, Azad, Dilan & Emir
Menderes Samancılar as Celil Sönmez - Husband of Bedar, father of Sila, Azad, Dilan & Emir
Fatoş Tez as Kevser Genco/Kevser Hanım/Hanım Ağa - Wife of Firuz Ağa, mother of Boran & Narin
Fatoş Sezer as Mehveş - Sister of Bedar, aunt of Sila, Azad, Dilan & Emir
Muhammed Cangören as Zinar Genco - Brother of  Firuz Ağa, father of Cihan & Dilaver, uncle of Boran & Narin 
Kartal Balaban as Emre Türkoğlu - Friend & in love with Sila, son of Kenan
Devrim Saltoğlu as Cihan Genco - Son of Zinar, brother of Dilaver, husband of Ümmü, kills to Azad, killed shot by Burhan
Cemal Toktaş as Azad Sönmez - Son of Bedar & Celil, husband of Narin, brother of Sila, Dilan & Emir, killed by Cihan
Boncuk Yılmaz as Narin Genco/Narin Sönmez - Wife of Azad, daughter of Kevser & Firuz Ağa, sister of Boran
Tayanç Ayaydın as Abay - Best friend and "brother" of Boran
İsmet Hürmüzlü as Firuz Ağa/Firuz Genco #1 - Former leader of Mardin tribe, husband of Kevser, father of Boran & Narin, brother of Zinar
Namık Kemal Yiğittürk as Firuz Ağa/Firuz Genco #2 - Former leader of Mardin tribe, husband of Kevser, father of Boran & Narin, brother of Zinar
Vural Tantekin as Şivan - Brother of Ayşe, employee of Boran
Celil Nalçakan as Dilaver Genco - Son of Zinar, brother of Cihan
Sermiyan Midyat as Berzan - commits suicide
Tarık Şerbetçioğlu as Burhan Özdemir - Nephew of Erkan & Nese, husband of Esma, kill shot to Cihan, killed by prisoner in jail
Gökçe Yanardağ as Esma Özdemir - Wife of Burhan, mistress of Cihan, try to kills shot to Sila
İpek Tanrıyar as Zeynep
Esra Akhisarlı as Zeliha
Duygu Eriçok as Dr. Ceren
Serap Doğan as Ümmü - Wife of Cihan
Sinem Yaruk as Ayşe - Sister of Şivan, servant of Boran
Mehmet Dağ as Emir Sönmez - Son of Bedar & Celil, brother of Sila, Azad & Dilan
Hümeyra Akbay as Nese Özdemir - Wife of Erkan, step-mother of Sila, killed in car accident
Cüneyt Turel as Erkan Özdemir - Husband of Nese, step-father of Sila, killed in car accident
Zeynep Anıl Tatdıran as Dilan Sönmez - Daughter of Bedar & Celil, sister of Sila, Azad & Emir
Burçin Oraloğlu as Kenan Türkoğlu - Father of Emre
Sema Mumcu as Gizem
Muzaffer Demirel as Edip
Yüksel Arıcı as Ahmet Ağa - try to kills to Boran, ends up goes to jail
Boğaçhan Yağ as Ömer
Emin Yaşar as Osman
Gürol Güngör as Samim
Nalan Gücüpek as Dr. Duygu Kaya

References

External links
 
Official Sıla Website  broken link
Sıla on ATV
Sıla Dizisi Online - Sıla Fansite  broken link
Official Greek Sıla Website
Slovak Sıla Website
Croatian Sıla Website  broken link

Turkish drama television series
2006 Turkish television series debuts
2008 Turkish television series endings
2000s Turkish television series
ATV (Turkey) original programming
Turkish television series endings
Television shows set in Istanbul
Television series produced in Istanbul